Mary Magdalene Church or Church of Mary Magdalene may refer to:

 Church of Mary Magdalene, Budapest
 Church of Mary Magdalene, Jerusalem
 Church of St. Mary Magdalene, Tarnobrzeg, Poland
 Maria Magdalena Church, Stockholm

See also
 St. Mary Magdalene's Church (disambiguation)